The Bărzăuța (in its upper course also: Apa Roșie) is a right tributary of the river Uz in Romania. It discharges into the Uz near Valea Uzului.

References

Rivers of Romania
Rivers of Harghita County
Rivers of Bacău County